Arborg Airport  is located  west of Arborg, Manitoba, Canada.

References

External links
 Page about this airport on COPA's Places to Fly airport directory

Registered aerodromes in Manitoba